Petsch Moser is an indie rock band from Vienna, Austria.
They took their rather unusual name from Swiss skier Petsch Moser, who gave his consent to the use of his name. 2005 the band was nominated for the Amadeus Austrian Music Award.

History
Founded 1995 in Lower Austria, the band soon relocated to Vienna, where the scene for indie rock music was growing at that time. Especially Austrian radio channel FM4 contributed to their success with playing the group's songs regularly. Most of the songs are written in German, but some older ones are in English as well. After Andreas Remenyi (vocals, guitar) left the band in 2006, the band tours as a five-piece with Lukas Müller on keyboards and Martin Knobloch on bass.

Discography
 1999 - Bitte Sweet Me
 2002 - Von Städten und Bäumen
 2004 - Die Stellen
 2004 - Vinyl: Hinter Glas inkl. Remixe (Masterplan Records)
 2005 - DVD: A Night At The Flex
 2006 - Reforma
 2010 - Johnny

External links
 Official Website
 Fansite
 Petsch Moser on myspace

Notes

Austrian indie rock groups